Vehicle registration plates of Laos started in 1950. The current version started in 2001.

Vehicle types

References 

Transport in Laos
Laos
Laos transport-related lists
1950 introductions
1950 establishments in Laos